Viktoria is the fifth studio album by Norwegian singer-songwriter Maria Mena. Like Cause and Effect, Viktoria is also produced by Martin Sjølie.

Track listing

Singles
 "This Too Shall Pass" (2011)
 "Homeless" (2011)
 "Viktoria" (2011)
 "A Stranger to Me" (2011): due to large requests from fans, the formerly Germany exclusive song was also released as a single in other countries.

Certifications

References

External links
 https://www.mariamenamusic.com/2020/02/viktoria-lyrics-maria-mena.html
 https://web.archive.org/web/20120321005422/http://www.downloadcharts.net/ger/artists/music/maria-mena/albums/viktoria/
 http://www.platekompaniet.no/Musikk.aspx/Artist/Maria_Mena/?id=00011111

Maria Mena albums
2011 albums